Gandhi Bilel Djuna (born 6 May 1986), better known by his stage name Maître Gims and more recently just Gims (sometimes stylized as GIMS), is a Congolese rapper, singer and songwriter. He grew up in France and currently lives in France and Morocco. He is a former member of the hip hop group Sexion d'Assaut and released his first major album, Subliminal in 2013. The album sold over a million copies in France and peaked at number two in the Syndicat National de l'Édition Phonographique. His other two albums follow: Mon cœur avait raison in 2015 and Ceinture noire in 2018 reached number one in France and Belgium (Wallonia) and peaked in the top 40 in various European countries, including Denmark, Italy and Switzerland.

He has topped the French singles charts four times, including once as a featured artist, most recently in 2018 with his song "La même". The song was the most performed in France in 2018 and it helped Gims become the most performed artist on French television and radio for the same year. In 2018, he was the 7th most performed artist in the world on Deezer. During his career he has worked with several international artists such as Sia, Pitbull, Lil Wayne, Stromae, Maluma, Sting and others. He has sold over 5 million records, including 3 million albums since the start of his career.

In 2020, he won the International Artist of the Year in Distinctive International Arab Festivals Awards after his featuring in Mohamed Ramadan's song "Ya habibi". On 17 September 2020, Netflix released a documentary about the last ten years of his career titled Gims: On the Record. In 2022, he played the song "Arhbo" for the 2022 FIFA World Cup along with Ozuna, which they also performed during the closing ceremony.

Early life 
Gandhi Djuna was born on 6 May 1986 in Kinshasa, Zaire (Now the Democratic Republic of the Congo since 1997). He comes from a family of musicians: his father Djanana Djuna is the singer of Papa Wemba's Viva La Musica troupe. He arrived in France in 1988 at the age of two, with his parents who were then foreigners in an irregular situation.

Because of his parents hiding, he explains having had a difficult childhood. He was placed with foster families, before living in squats until he was 18 years old. This passage from his life is mentioned in his book Vise le soleil. He is part of a family of fourteen children. He is the brother of Dadju, member of the group The Shin Sekaï, of Bedjik, Afi (formerly Xgangs) and Djelass, all three of them rappers. On his first album Subliminal (2013), they participate in the song "Outsider". Gims grew up in the 3rd arrondissement of Paris. His family then moved to the 9th arrondissement and finally to the 19th arrondissement. Gims studied graphic design and communication.

He takes the nickname "Gims" in reference to Asian cinema and the world of martial arts.

Career

Sexion d'Assaut (2002–2012) 
In 2002, Gims formed with the rappers JR O Crom and Makan the trio Prototype 3015. The name of the group was chosen in reference to a film, mainly for its "combative" meaning. The name Sexion d'Assaut also includes a reference to the Sturmabteilung (SA), in French "Section d'Assaut", a famous Nazi paramilitary unit, which the group learns by chance during a concert for the City of Paris. In 2005, the trio merged with Assonance, another group from the Sexion d'Assaut collective. The group is now called 3rd Prototype.

After a few pieces produced independently, Sexion d'Assault meets their agent, Dawala, in the cellars of Châtelet-Les Halles in Paris. With Dawala, the 3rd Prototype released its first mixtape, La Terre du Milieu, on 13 May 2006. Gims designed the CD cover. In 2007, they released the album Le Renouveau, which contained the well-known piece "Anti Tectonick".

Through Prototype 3015 first, then Prototype 3, Gims is part of the Sexion d'Assaut supergroup. Sexion d'Assaut released his first songs between 2002 and 2003. Among them, we find Gang yaba Gang, Coup 2 pression and Frères de rue. With Sexion d'Assault, Gims participates twice in the 12 Inch'All Star, a famous rap competition in the Parisian underground which takes place at the Batofar. He came in second place and gained notoriety, now known as one of the best kickers (freestylers) in France.

In 2008, the group presented monthly freestyles called Les Chroniques du mois: each month, at least two freestyle songs were released via audio or video. In January 2009, Sexion d'Assaut published a net-tape renamed Les Chroniques du 75, a compilation also containing previously unreleased tracks, including the solo piece "À 30%" by Gims.

Sexion d'Assaut's second street album, L'Écrasement de tête, was released in May 2009 on Because Music. The last sub-entity of the supergroup, 3rd Prototype, disappears completely. LÉcrasement de tête acquired a certain notoriety with the general public thanks to titles and music videos, including "T'es bête ou quoi?" and "Wati Bon Son" (in collaboration with Dry). Sexion d'Assaut goes on tour, notably opening for Orelsan and Medina. The Head Crush sells more than 50,000 copies. Following the release of LÉcrasement de tête, the group left Because Music due to misunderstandings and signed with Sony Music Entertainment.

In 2010, Sexion d'Assaut released the studio album L'École des points vitaux. Gims is credited there as a singer-songwriter. He composed the instrumental tracks of several pieces, including "Ils appellent ça "Casquette à l'envers". Other beatmakers also participate in the album, such as SoulChildren with "La drogue te donne des ailes". The album met with great success with the general public, selling over 400,000 copies. The group opens for Suprême NTM at the Parc des Princes and performs at the Zénith de Paris.

In April 2011, a controversy broke out over the group's openly homophobic claims. In reaction to criticism, Sexion d'Assaut decided to release a mixtape entitled En attendant L'Apogée: les Chroniques du 75, which despite everything met with success with titles like "Paris va bien" and "Qui t'a dit". The project contains a DVD including a video of one of the songs, as well as a documentary retracing the group's journey.

In March 2012, they released their second album, L'Apogée, which was more successful than the first. The album sold over 700,000 copies. The same year, Gims published an online comic entitled Au cœur du vortex.

In parallel with his career with Sexion d'Assaut, Gims tried his hand at musical composition. At the end of 2006, he released his first solo project, an Extended play entitled Pour ceux qui dorment les yeux ouverts. The EP is produced by ATK's Fredy K and Noko. With a very limited pressing, the disc aims to make Gims known to the general public. The record features tracks with Sexion d'Assaut, Scred Connexion rapper Koma and a singer named Carole.

Subliminal (2012–2015) 
On 29 January 2013, in the video Welcome to the Wa Part. 4: La Consecration, Gims announces the release of his first solo studio album, Subliminal, for 20 May 2013. On 1 March Gims publishes "Meurtre par strangulation". On 15 March he unveils "J'me tire", his second single which remains ranked number 1 on the French charts for four consecutive weeks, the clip being released on 10 April 2013. In an interview on the Rapelite.com site, Gims confirms the presence of rapper Pitbull on a track entitled "Pas touché". His three brothers, Bedjik, Dadju and X-Gang, from the group MM Solja, are reunited on the track "Outsider".

On 4 May he published "Bella". On 13 May it broadcasts "VQ2PQ" exclusively on Skyrock. On 14 May it broadcasts, still exclusively, It Works, in collaboration with The Shin Sekaï. Subliminal is released on 20 May.

To promote it, Gims unveils previously unreleased tracks, which will not be part of the album, in the form of a series of video clips entitled This is not a clip. On the commercial side, the album is certified double diamond disc with more than 1 million sales.

On 31 May 2013, he performed his first solo concert at the Olympia. He participates in the album Racine carrée of Stromae on the song "AVF" featuring with Orelsan. Gims announces that he wants to take a break after the last date of the Sexion d'Assaut tour, 28 September 2013 at the Stade de France for Urban Peace, which also brings together IAM, Orelsan, Youssoupha, La Fouine, Psy 4 de la Rime, Rohff and Stromae. He also intends to take care of his couple and his four children, whom he says he has seen too little because of his career (the oldest of his four children was born around 2008 and the youngest in 2013). The new Sexion d'Assaut album is then scheduled for November 2015.

In September 2013, he participated in the single "Game Over" by singer Vitaa. The song ranks first in sales of singles in France. On 22 November 2013, Gims unveils his new clip "Changer", which ranks 17th for the week of 1 December 2013. With this ballad, Gims hopes to reach a new, wider audience.

In February 2014, Gims was nominated in the Urban Music category at the Victoires de la Musique, but the award was finally awarded to the 1995 group. His solo career was nonetheless a success. According to the magazine Challenges, the singer is the second highest paid French artist of 2013, behind Mylène Farmer but just ahead of Johnny Hallyday.

Mon cœur avait raison (2015–2016) 
In parallel with the announcement of his Warano Tour, Gims published videos via social networks with extracts of songs that turned out to be those of his future album. In addition, he announces the release on 20 February 2016 of the seventh video of This is not a clip with Fuck Ramses which could not take place.

Although announced for the month of March, the release of the first single from the album "Est-ce que tu m'aimes?" took place on 28 April on Skyrock. In addition, he announces that the album will be divided into two parts: the Blue Pill which is a part made up of urban pop songs, and the Red Pill which is oriented towards rap. This concept was inspired by the movie The Matrix. Some time later, the first single from The Red Pill titled "Melynda Gates" followed by a clip is released.

Then, Gims unveils the second extract of the Blue Pill called "Laissez passer", the clip of which brings together his family, his father and his brothers. At the end of July, Gims continues with "Longue vie" (Red Pill) with Lefa which marks his return to the music scene, the clip brings together all the Sexion d'Assaut.

The tracklist and the release date of the album are announced by Gims on social networks: the album will be released on 28 August. At the end of August, a new single: "Brisé", is available. Subsequently, he released 4 other singles from his double album ("Tu vas me manquer", "Je te pardonne", "ABCD" as well as "Sapés comme jamais"). Then he announced the reissue of his album which will be released on 26 August 2016. Mon cœur avait raison runs out to 700,000 copies.

On 23 April 2016, Gims gave a concert before the football match between Paris Saint-Germain F.C. and Lille OSC for the 2016 Coupe de la Ligue Final. He performs there excerpts from three of his hits "Est-ce que tu m'aimes?", "Bella" and "Sapés comme jamais".

The singer is booed by the spectators, upon his arrival on the lawn. When the rapper shouts to the audience "Shall we continue?" ", The spectators shout" No! ". Interviewed in Morocco, Gims reveals that he did not hear the whistles when he sang and that these violent criticisms did not shock him. He argues that the supporters are alcoholic and some of them were for Lille, while Gims is Parisian. The rapper ends by acknowledging that there are a lot of people who do not like his music but would be ready to redo the experience for his fans.

Ceinture noire (2016–2019) 

Gims announces the release of Ceinture noire on 9 November 2016. Having left the Wati B label in December 2016, the album is released on TF1 Group under the Play Two label. On 7 May 2017, shortly after his official announcement, Gims published an extract on Instagram entitled "Marabout". The title accompanied by a clip is officially released on its new YouTube channel on 12 May 2017.

On 10 November 2017, Gims broadcast the first official clip of Ceinture noire, titled "Caméléon" on streaming platforms. On 12 December he posted the clip on his YouTube channel. The clip exceeds 10 million views in 2 weeks. Ceinture noire is released on 23 March 2018.

Gims unveils the tracklist and release date of his third solo album Ceinture noire for 23 March 2018, with 31 tracks + 3 bonus tracks to choose from. Then he reissued 4 bonus tracks on the Ceinture noire album in full version for 24 August 2018. On 14 March 2019 on YouTube, Gims finally released the reissue of the Ceinture noire album entitled Transcendance with 13 bonus tracks.

It includes South American superstar Maluma and J Balvin as well as Vitaa, his brother Dadju, Alonzo and Sting. In 2019, he sang "Reste" with Sting. The clip was shot in Transports en commun lyonnais. The album is currently certified diamond disc with over 990,000 sales. It is approaching 1,000,000 in sales, synonymous with the double diamond disc. On 28 September 2019, he officially became the first French-speaking rapper to fill the Stade de France with more than 72,000 spectators.

Le fléau (2020–present) 
In 2020, Gims announced his plan to release an entirely rap album. Le fléau was released on 6 November 2020. On 27 March 2020, during a live Instagram with Dadju, Gims announced the album Le Retour des Rois for release that year. "Here we are in the negotiations, of who, or, the album will be released, with whom it will be distributed. You know, the things a little technical."

On 30 March 2020 in this recording, Gims listens to several songs from the Sexion d'Assaut album Le Retour des Rois while driving in his car. On 2 May 2020, during a live return to Instagram with Sniper, Sefyu and Gradur. Gims has formalized his 100% rap album for the start of the 2020 school year at the latest, and Le Retour des Rois for the end of 2020, or even the beginning of 2021. After the end of the first confinement on 11 May 2020, Gims announces the return of the Sexion d'Assaut with the new album Le Retour des Rois, scheduled for the fall.

The Sexion d'Assaut will make its comeback in concert at Paris La Défense Arena on 25 September 2021, a date officially set for January but postponed due to the raging health crisis. On 28 August 2020, Kendji Girac and Gims will unveil their title "Dernier Métro", produced as a duo. The same day, he released the first single from the album entitled "Yolo", an urban pop sound, very dancing in which he recounts his journey in music. On 17 September 2020, on Netflix, a documentary was released retracing the last ten years of his career titled Gims: On the Record.

On 25 September 2020, he released the second single from the album entitled "Immortel", a purely rap sound featuring a very kicker Gims, from the time of the Sexion d'Assault. Due to the COVID-19 pandemic, the release of his album Le Fléau has been delayed indefinitely. On 26 November 2020, Gims announced on his social networks that his album Le Fléau would be released on 4 December. On 2 December 2020, Gims therefore unveils the tracklist of his fourth album Le Fléau with 17 tracks for 9 featurings. Among the featurings, we find some big names of French rap like Vald, Kaaris, Heuss l'Enfoiré or the revelations Leto, Bosh and Gazo. The album was certified platinum a month and a half after its release. On 17 March 2021, Gims publishes a new freestyle named "Pyongyang" in collaboration with l'nsolent. On 5 April 2021, he published on streaming platforms a new title called "GJS" in collaboration with Jul and SCH, as well as the title called "Belle", in collaboration with Dadju and Slimane. He appears in a video supporting right-wing candidate Valérie Pecresse in the run-up to the 2021 regional elections in Île-de-France.

On 28 April 2021, Gims announces the reissue of the album entitled Les Vestiges du Fléau which will be released on 28 May 2021. On 19 May 2021, he publishes the list of titles composed of 10 tracks including 8 collaborations and two solos . Among the guests of the reissue, in addition to Jul, SCH, Dadju and Slimane, participate, in particular, international singers such as the Egyptian Mohamed Ramadan, the Tanzanian Rayvanny as well as the German-Albanian singer Dhurata Dora. On 28 May 2021, the same day as the release of the reissue, Gims released the clip for "Only You" in collaboration with Dhurata Dora. On 8 October 2021, he released a new single in collaboration with Vitaa named "Prends ma main". In November 2021, he participated in the collective project Le Classico organisé, on Jul's initiative, bringing together more than 150 rappers from Bouches-du-Rhône and Île-de-France.

Les dernières volontés de Mozart (2022) 
On 5 October 2022, Gims revealed the album's title, its release date and its cover. At the same time, the pre-order of the record was made available, accompanied by three tickets, gold, platinum and diamond to be won. On 28 September 2022, Gims unveiled a date on social networks, 09/30. On 30 September 2022, Gims released the single "Maintenant". On 10 November 2022, he unveils "Thémistocle" and announces the release of the clip the next day, 11 November at 1:00 p.m.

On 14 November 2022, he unveiled part of the album's tracklist containing 14 titles and three collaborations with Carla Bruni, Soolking and Tayc. In reality, the album contains a total of 18 tracks but only 14 have been revealed so far. On 25 November 2022, two titles are revealed "Après-vous madame" featuring Soolking and "Demain" with Carla Bruni. The album was released on 2 December 2022, containing 18 tracks and three features with Soolking, Carla Bruni and Tayc.

Personal life 
Gandhi Djuna married two women: a Frenchwoman who lives in Morocco, and with whom he had two children, from whom he is separated but would never have divorced; then a Frenchwoman of Malian origin Demdem, married in 2005 and with whom he has three children. He spends his time between France and Morocco.

In more recent interviews, Gims has actually denied the rumours, calling them "absolutely false" and going on to say that he has only been married once. 

He converted to Islam in 2004. In 2005, he joined the fundamentalist movement of the Tablighi Jamaat, which he then left and now considers a sect. He says in a documentary dedicated to him on Netflix: "There were people who ended up dead, committed suicide in Iraq, People who were next to me, And that freaked me out, I don't know where I could have ended up." Originally a Catholic, he indicated in 2016 that Barack Adama, his friend from the group Sexion d'Assaut, convinced him to convert to Islam, as well as after an interview with an imam.

In March 2018, he indicated that he applied for French nationality and that it was refused. According to the press, this decision would be because of his “bigamy”, which is not authorized in French or European law.

In early 2022, he relaunches the procedure for obtaining French nationality. The Minister of the Interior, Gérald Darmanin, estimated on 25 January 2022 on France Inter that the rapper's recent comments on the New Year did not demonstrate "good proof of assimilation into French society", going to against article 21-24 of the Napoleonic Code. However, the minister assures that his request would be, like all the others, re-examined by his services.

Monstre Marin Corporation 

In 2013, Gims founded Monstre Marin Corporation with Pascal Nègre. The latter announces the direct integration of MMC into Universal. "Gims is one of the most gifted artists of his generation! I am delighted to accompany him with Universal Music in his discovery of new talents and in the development of his label Sea Monster", he explains on his Twitter page. The label's logo was unveiled in early 2014.

In February 2014, L'Algérino joined the label, followed in June 2014 by Mac Tyer. Monstre Marin Corporation published its first compilation La Monster Party chapitre 1 on 30 June 2014. According to BFM TV, Gims sold 50% of the label Monstre Marin Corporation in 2014 for 500,000 euros. This structure sold to Universal Music France brought together many artists such as Vitaa, Souf, Mac Tyer, L'Algérino, MA2X, Lartiste or even the Marin Monster duo, now all gone and replaced by emerging artists like DJ Arafat, DJ Last One, Amalya or Savana blues. The label ends its activities on 13 January 2020.

Gims and sunglasses 
Gims is famous for always wearing sunglasses in public, in fact, it is rare to find pictures of him without glasses on the Internet, and the reason for this is so that he is not recognized on the street when he is without glasses because of his wide popularity in France and Paris in particular, and he previously stated that this method works. The only time Gims took off his glasses in public was at a live concert with the group Sexion d'Assaut when he danced with the group members but little was noticed on his face because the stage was almost dark.

Artistic environment 
Gims' music is influenced by hip-hop and dance, with pop and Latin touches. Just before his first album, Les Inrocks compares Gims to footballer Lionel Messi for his versatility: "Gims has a vast arsenal. He sings, raps, composes and produces." For his first album, the artist addresses his joys, his questions, his anger and his rants. In September 2013, he told Liberation that "he is not forbidding himself anything. A rock or even varietal album 'does not scare him'.

The second album is divided into two parts: an "urban pop / R&B" oriented, widely broadcast by radio and music channels, and a "rap" oriented as it did when it started. The humorist of the web Jhon Rachid deplores that the second part "old-fashioned rap" is less known than the first, which hurts him "rap" (title of his show on YouTube). As for Joeystarr, he often criticizes him on social networks, calling his music "music for prepubescents". The slammer Grand Corps Malade said in an interview that he does not adhere to the music of Gims, which is "teenage pop" with "poor lyrics and an unpleasant voice".

The Booska-P site evokes "Gims-bashing" in an article presenting the most hated French rappers which also include Bigflo & Oli, Jul and Booba. Rap "purists" like Joeystarr or Jhon Rachid cited above reproach him for the touches of pop and dance; some calling his music "camping music" or "zumba". Hated by a part of the rap fans, he is also hated by a part of the general public who do not like rap and prefer variety or rock. Part of the press considers Gims as an artist of the subculture with very weak texts, like the literary critic Éric Naulleau declaring that Gims made "the worst texts of French song".

Influences 
He cites artists such as Booba, Nate Dogg, Marvin Gaye, Michael Jackson, 50 Cent, Eminem or even Tandem as his main influences.

Controversies 
In April 2017, it was said that he cancelled a concert in Alès due to the lack of a private jet to take him there; the organizer did not have the means to pay for it. The headlines criticised it as a "star whim". Following the media coverage, he gave a free and improvised concert in the Paris metro. In the program Touche pas à mon poste !, Gims explained that the concert was initially only a proposal which was ultimately not accepted. However, the promoter had already started selling the tickets. Faced with the risk of financial loss, the promoter contacted the rapper's producer offering to fly Gims to the concert by private jet, but Gims could not attend due to a scheduling conflict with another concert.

Plagiarism 
Gims and Vianney were accused of plagiarism by the Belgian director Charlotte Abramow for the clip "La même". Abramow had directed a video for the International Women's Day of 8 March 2018, with which "La même", according to her, had many similarities: "[the video for La même has] the same structure, the same esthetics, the same decorations in pastel colors and especially the same types of portraits". Maitre Gims responded by accusing Charlotte Abramow of having herself violated copyright by using a clip from the music video for the song "Silent All These Years" by Tori Amos.

Christmas 
At the end of 2021, he believes that celebrating Christmas or wishing a happy new year "is not Muslim". He is also opposed to birthday celebrations because this tradition is of non-Muslim origin.

Homophobia 
Among several homophobic lyrics with his band Sexion D'Assaut, in 2008, in the song "On t'a humilié", Gims pronounces the sentence "I think it's time for the faggots to perish, cut off their penises and leave them dead on the ring road".

Diversification 
At the beginning of 2013, Gims founded his own clothing brand, Vortex Vx, sold in particular at Veepee and Gémo. On 31 October 2018, the manga Devil's Relics was published, imagined by Gims with his brother Darcy, and co-signed by the two brothers with screenwriter Jean-David Morvan and designer Yoshiyasu Tamura.

Lyricist 
In addition to writing his own lyrics, he also writes for other artists. In 2013, Gims participated as a "guest" in the Popstars program, in which he gave young groups advice for their career. Following this intervention, he wrote the first single of the winning group, The Mess, entitled Au Top. This single  reached 8th on the iTunes chart.

Discography

Solo 
 Subliminal (2013)
 Mon cœur avait raison (2015)
 Ceinture noire (2018)
 Le fléau (2020)
 Les dernières volontés de Mozart (2022)

With Sexion d'Assaut 
L'Ecrasement de tête (2009)
 L'École des points vitaux (2010)
 L'Apogée (2012)

Filmography

Film

Concert tours 

 Warano Tour (2016)
 Fuego Tour (2019)

Awards and nominations

References

External links 

 

 
1986 births
Living people
People from Kinshasa
Converts to Islam
Democratic Republic of the Congo rappers
Democratic Republic of the Congo Muslims
French rappers
French Muslims
Democratic Republic of the Congo emigrants to France
Masked musicians
Black French musicians
Fifa World Cup ceremonies performers